The State Highway 96 Bridge is a modern steel girder bridge with a concrete deck, carrying Arkansas Highway 96 across Vache Grass Creek east of Greenwood, Arkansas.  It is a replacement for a historic steel pony truss bridge, built in 1938.  The historic bridge was listed on the National Register of Historic Places in 1995.

See also
National Register of Historic Places listings in Sebastian County, Arkansas
List of bridges on the National Register of Historic Places in Arkansas

References

Road bridges on the National Register of Historic Places in Arkansas
Bridges completed in 1938
National Register of Historic Places in Sebastian County, Arkansas
Steel bridges in the United States
Girder bridges in the United States
Truss bridges in the United States
1938 establishments in Arkansas
Transportation in Sebastian County, Arkansas